The Wausau Timbers were a minor league baseball team, located in Wausau, Wisconsin. The Timbers were members of the Class A Midwest League from 1975 to 1990. The franchise was sold in 1991 and moved to Geneva, Illinois, where it became the Kane County Cougars.

History
The franchise first played 1975 in Wausau as the Wausau Mets. The club maintained an affiliation with the New York Mets through 1978. Without an affiliation the team changed its name to the Timbers and played two years as a co-op with players mainly from the Cleveland Indians, Texas Rangers, and Seattle Mariners. In 1981 the club signed a played development contract with the Mariners. The affiliation with the Mariners lasted nine seasons. In 1990 the club signed on with the Baltimore Orioles and played their final season in Wausau.

The Ballpark
The Timbers played at Athletic Park, 324 E. Wausau Ave. Wausau, Wisconsin  Built in 1936, Athletic Park was home to the Timbers of the Class-A Midwest League (1975–1990) and previous minor league teams: the Wausau Lumberjacks (1936–1942, 1946–1949, 1956–57) and the Wausau Timberjacks (1950–1953).

The ballpark has hosted the Wisconsin Woodchucks of the summer collegiate Northwoods League, beginning in 1994.

Notable alumni

Baseball Hall of Fame alumni
Edgar Martínez (1984) Inducted, 2019

Notable alumni
Manny Alexander (1990) 
Neil Allen (1976)
Juan Berenguer (1975) 
Damon Buford (1990)
Ivan Calderon (1981–1982) MLB All-Star
Chuck Carr (1988) 1993 NL stolen base leader
Roy Lee Jackson (1975) 
Bill Monbouquette (1976, MGR) 4x MLB All-Star
Ed Nunez (1980-1981)
Jim Presley (1980-1981) MLB All-Star
Harold Reynolds (1981) 2x MLB All-Star; 1987 AL stolen base leader
Alex Trevino (1977) 
Omar Vizquel (1986) 11x Gold Glove; 3x MLB All-Star
Mookie Wilson (1977) MLB All-Star
Ned Yost (1975) Manager, 2015 World Series champion - Kansas City Royals 
Gregg Zaun (1990)

Record

References

External links
Wausau Timbers at The Baseball Cube

Defunct Midwest League teams
Sports in Wausau, Wisconsin
Baltimore Orioles minor league affiliates
Seattle Mariners minor league affiliates
Defunct baseball teams in Wisconsin
New York Mets minor league affiliates
Professional baseball teams in Wisconsin
1975 establishments in Wisconsin
1990 disestablishments in Wisconsin
Baseball teams established in 1975
Baseball teams disestablished in 1990